The 2001 Crown Prince Cup was the 26th season of the Saudi premier knockout tournament since its establishment in 1957. The main competition started on 10 March 2001 and concluded with the final on 2 May 2001.

Al-Hilal were the defending champions, but were eliminated in the semi-finals by Al-Ittihad.

In the final, Al-Ittihad defeated Al-Ettifaq 3–0 to secure their record-extending sixth title and first since 1997. The final was held at the Prince Abdullah Al-Faisal Stadium in Jeddah.

Qualifying rounds
All of the competing teams that are not members of the Premier League competed in the qualifying rounds to secure one of 4 available places in the Round of 16. First Division sides Abha, Al-Khaleej, Al-Raed and Al-Tai qualified.

Bracket

Source: Al Jazirah

Round of 16
The Round of 16 fixtures were played on 10, 13, 14, 15 and 16 March 2001. Al-Shabab's match was moved to 10 March due to their participation in the Round of 16 of the 2000–01 Asian Cup Winners' Cup. All times are local, AST (UTC+3).

Quarter-finals
The Quarter-finals fixtures were played on 29, 30 and 31 March 2001. All times are local, AST (UTC+3).

Semi-finals
The Semi-finals fixtures were played on 12 and 13 April 2001. All times are local, AST (UTC+3).

Final
The 2001 Crown Prince Cup Final was played on 2 May 2001 at the Prince Abdullah Al-Faisal Stadium in Jeddah between Al-Ettifaq and Al-Ittihad. This was the seventh Crown Prince Cup final to be held at the stadium. The two sides met twice in the final, Al-Ettifaq won in 1965 while Al-Ittihad won in 1963. This was Al-Ettifaq's first final since 1965 and Al-Ittihad first since 1997. All times are local, AST (UTC+3).

Top goalscorers

See also
 2000–01 Saudi Premier League

References

Saudi Crown Prince Cup seasons
2001 domestic association football cups
Crown Prince Cup